This is a list of Italian television related events from 2009.

Events
21 March - Emanuele Filiberto, Prince of Venice and Piedmont and his partner Natalia Titova win the fifth season of Ballando con le stelle.
19 April - Matteo Becucci wins the second season of X Factor.
20 April - Ferdi Berisa wins the ninth season of Grande Fratello.
2 December - Marco Mengoni wins the third season of X Factor.

Debuts

RAI

Serials 

 Il commissario Manara – mix of procedural and romantic comedy, with Guido Caprino and Roberta Giarrusso, spin-off of Una famiglia in giallo; 2 seasons.

International
2 December -  United States of Tara (Mya) (2009–2011)

Television shows

RAI

Drama 

 Una sera di ottobre (An october evening) – by Vittorio Sindoni, with Vanessa Hessler, Gabriele Greco and Ottavia Piccolo ; 2 episodes. A naive young girl becomes detective to save her boy-friend, charged of murder.
 Tutta la verità (The whole truth) – by Cinzia Th. Torrini, with Vittoria Puccini and Daniele Pecci; 2 episodes. The quiet life of a female lawyer is upset by the passion for an ambiguous surgeon, till to be accused for the murder of her lover’s wife.

Variety 

Ballando con le stelle (2005–present)
X Factor (2008–present)

News and educational 

 L’incantatore di serpenti, la vita senza freno di Giancarlo Fusco (The snake charmer, Giancarlo Fusco’s boundless life) – documentary by Salvatore Allocca.

2000s
Grande Fratello (2000–present)

Ending this year

Births

Deaths

See also
2009 in Italy
List of Italian films of 2009

References